Monsignor McClancy Memorial High School is a co-educational Catholic high school located in the East Elmhurst neighborhood of Queens, New York. As of Fall 2012, the school started accepting young women. Founded by the Brothers of the Sacred Heart in 1956, Msgr. McClancy Memorial High School serves the Roman Catholic Diocese of Brooklyn and provides education for approximately 550 students from grades 9 to 12. Admissions is open to any student of any ethnicity and of any faith, but requires TACHS (Test for Admission into Catholic High Schools) scores from students entering from the 8th grade; students on other levels contact the school directly. The school was first founded in 1956, dedicated to the memory of Msgr. Joseph V. McClancy, a long time diocesan Superintendent of Schools for the Roman Catholic Diocese of Brooklyn.
The school is chartered by the Board of Regents of the University of the State of New York and accredited by the Middle States Association of Colleges and Schools.

McClancy draws students from eighty-five parochial and public schools located throughout Queens, Brooklyn, Manhattan and Long Island.

Athletics

The McClancy athletics program includes:
 
 Basketball- boys and girls
 Baseball- boys
 Softball- girls 
 Tennis- boys and girls
 Volleyball- girls
 Soccer- boys and girls
 Track and field- boys and girls
 Bowling- boys and girls
 Swimming and diving- boys and girls
 Handball- boys and girls
 Cheerleading- girls
 Golf - boys and girls
 Hockey- boys and girls

Renovation

The school has recently undergone an extensive renovation project which included soundproofing and air conditioning for each classroom. The school has also fully renovated the biology, chemistry, and physics labs over the summer of 2011. Over the summer of 2012, the school created a new media center, and a new art studio. In April 2022, the new Stephen J. Squeri '77 Sports Complex was completed due to a special donation from alumni, and current American Express CEO, Steve Squeri.

Notable alumni

 George Bruns, former NBA player for New York Nets (1972–73)
 Eddie Buczynski, Wicca and gay rights activist
 Rich Conaty, radio disc jockey
 Don Cooper, pitching coach for Chicago White Sox (2002-2020); played for New York Yankees (1985)
 Michael DenDekker, politician
 John Kenrick, theatre writer
 Walter McCaffrey, politician
 Chris Megaloudis, former soccer player for New York Red Bulls
 Tom Nohilly, retired track athlete
 Jamal Robinson, former NBA player for Miami Heat in 2000

Notes and references

External links 
 Monsignor McClancy Memorial High School website

Educational institutions established in 1956
Roman Catholic Diocese of Brooklyn
East Elmhurst, Queens
Roman Catholic high schools in Queens, New York
1956 establishments in New York City